Jenni Rivera was an American regional Mexican singer. She was nicknamed "La Diva de la Banda" for her work in the banda genre. She has garnered nominations and awards at some of the most prestigious award ceremonies such the Latin Grammys, Oye! Awards, Billboard Music Awards, Latin Billboard Music Awards, and Lo Nuestro Awards.  She has released twelve studio albums over a 10 year-span of her career: Si Quieres Verme Llorar (1999), Reyna de Reynas (1999), Que Me Entierren Con la Banda (2000), Déjate Amar (2001), Se las Voy a Dar a Otro (2001), Homenaje a Las Grandes (2003), Parrandera, Rebelde y Atrevida (2005), Mi Vida Loca (2007), Jenni (2008), La Gran Señora (2009), Joyas Prestadas: Banda (2011), and Joyas Prestadas: Pop (2011). Live albums: En Vivo Desde Hollywood (2006), Besos y Copas Desde Hollywood (2006), La Diva En Vivo (2007), and La Gran Señora En Vivo (2010). Compilations: Simplemente La Mejor (2004), La Misma Gran Señora  (2012), and La Más Completa Colección (2012). Her family has released three posthumous live albums of her last concerts: 1969 - Siempre, En Vivo Desde Monterrey, Parte 1 (2013), 1969 - Siempre, En Vivo Desde Monterrey, Parte 2  (2014), and 1 Vida - 3 Historias: Metamorfosis - Despedida de Culican - Jenni Vive 2013 (2014).

Rivera was nominated for 113 awards, with 69 wins. She won 22 Billboard Latin Music Awards, 18 Lo Nuestro Awards, 11 Billboard Mexican Music Awards, and one BMI Award.

Billboard Music Awards
The Billboard Music Awards are awarded annually by the Billboard magazine in the United States. Rivera received two awards from six nominations posthumously.

|-
|rowspan="4" scope="row"|2013
| Jenni Rivera (herself)
| Top Latin Artist
| 
|-
| La Misma Gran Señora
| Top Latin Album
| 
|-
| Joyas Prestadas: Pop
| Top Latin Album
| 
|-
| Joyas Prestadas: Banda
| Top Latin Album
| 
|-
|rowspan="2" scope="row"|2014
| Jenni Rivera (herself)
| Top Latin Artist
| 
|-
| 1969 - Siempre, En Vivo Desde Monterrey, Parte 1 
| Top Latin Album
| 
|-

Billboard Latin Music Awards
The Billboard Latin Music Awards are awarded annually by the Billboard magazine in the United States. The Billboard awards are the Latin music industry's longest running and most prestigious award. Rivera received 22 awards from 35 nominations. 15 awards have been awarded posthumously.

|-
| 2007
| "De Contrabando"
| Regional Mexican Airplay Song of the Year
| 
|-
|rowspan="2" scope="row"| 2008
| Mi Vida Loca
| Regional Mexican Album Of The Year
| 
|-
| "Mirame"
| Regional Mexican Airplay Song Of The Year
| 
|-
|rowspan="3" scope="row"| 2009
| "Culpable O Inocente"
|rowspan="2" scope="row"| Hot Latin Song of the Year, Female
| 
|-
| "Inolvidable"
| 
|-
| Jenni (album)
| Top Latin Album of the Year, Female
| 
|-
|rowspan="2" scope="row"| 2010
|rowspan="2" scope="row"| Jenni Rivera (herself)
| Top Latin Albums Artist of the Year, Female
| 
|-
| Regional Mexican Airplay Artist of the Year, Female
| 
|-
|rowspan="3" scope="row"| 2012
|rowspan="3" scope="row"| Jenni Rivera (herself)
| Female Songs, Artist of the Year
| 
|-
| Female Album, Artist of the Year
| 
|-
| Regional Mexican: Artist of the Year, Solo
| 
|-
|rowspan="11" scope="row"| 2013
| Joyas Prestadas: Pop
| Album of the Year
| 
|-
|rowspan="2" scope="row"| Jenni Rivera (herself)
| Artist of the Year
| 
|-
| Regional Mexican Albums Artist of the Year, Solo
| 
|-
| La Misma Gran Señora
|rowspan="2" scope="row"| Regional Mexican Album of the Year
| 
|-
| Joyas Prestadas: Banda
| 
|-
|rowspan="2" scope="row"| Jenni Rivera (herself)
| Regional Mexican Song Artist of the Year, Solo
| 
|-
| Latin Pop Albums of the Year, Solo
| 
|-
| Joyas Prestadas: Pop
| Latin Pop Album of the Year
| 
|-
| Jenni Rivera (herself)
| Albums Artist of the Year, Female
| 
|-
| La Misma Gran Señora
| Album of the Year
| 
|-
| Jenni Rivera (herself)
| Artist of the Year
| 
|-
|rowspan="9" scope="row"| 2014
| La Misma Gran Señora
| Regional Mexican Album of the Year
| 
|-
|rowspan="4" scope="row"| Jenni Rivera (herself)
| Top Latin Albums Artist of the Year, Female
| 
|-
| Regional Mexican Albums Artist of the Year, Solo
| 
|-
| Artist of the Year
| 
|-
| Hot Latin Songs Artist of the Year, Female
| 
|-
| La Misma Gran Señora
| Top Latin Album of the Year
| 
|-
|rowspan="2" scope="row"| Joyas Prestadas: Pop
| Top Latin Album of the Year
| 
|-
| Latin Pop Album of the Year
| 
|-
| rowspan="4" scope="row"| Jenni Rivera (herself)
| Latin Pop Albums Artist of the Year, Solo
| 
|-
| rowspan="4" scope="row"|2015
| Hot Latin Songs Artist of the Year, Female
| 
|-
| Top Latin Albums Artist of the Year, Female
| 
|-
| Regional Mexican Albums Artist of the Year, Solo
| 
|-
| 1969 - Siempre, En Vivo Desde Monterrey, Parte 2
| Regional Mexican Album of the Year
| 
|-
|}

Billboard Mexican Music Awards
The Billboard Mexican Music Awards are awarded annually by the Billboard magazine in the United States. Rivera received eleven awards from fourteen nominations.

|-
|rowspan="5" scope="row"| 2011
|rowspan="2" scope="row"| Jenni Rivera (herself)
| Star Award (Honorary award) 
| 
|-
| Artist of the Year, Female
| 
|-
| La Gran Señora en Vivo
| Ranchero/Mariachi Album of the Year
| 
|-
| "Él"
| Ranchero/Mariachi Song of the Year
| 
|-
|rowspan="2" scope="row"| Jenni Rivera (herself)
| Ranchero/Mariachi Artist of the Year
| 
|-
|rowspan="2" scope="row"| 2012
| Artist of the Year, Female
| 
|-
| Joyas Prestadas: Banda
| Banda Album of the Year
| 
|-
|rowspan="7" scope="row"| 2013
|rowspan="3" scope="row"| Jenni Rivera (herself)
| Artist of the Year
| 
|-
| Artist of the Year, Female
| 
|-
| Digital Download Artist of the Year
| 
|-
| La Misma Gran Señora
| Album of the Year
| 
|-
| Jenni Rivera (herself)
| Artist of the Year, Albums 
| 
|-
| La Misma Gran Señora
| Banda Album of the Year
| 
|-
| Jenni Rivera (herself)
| Banda Artist of the Year
| 
|-

Broadcast Music, Inc. Awards
Broadcast Music, Inc. (BMI) annually hosts award shows that honor the songwriters, composers and music publishers of the year's most-performed songs in the BMI catalog. Rivera received one award from one nomination.

|-
| 2013
| "La Gran Señora"
| BMI Latin Music Award
| 
|-
|}

Imagen Awards
The Imagen Awards are administered by the Imagen Foundation, an organization dedicated to encouraging and recognizing the positive portrayals of Latinos in the entertainment industry. Rivera has received one award from one nomination.

|-
| 2012
| Jenni Rivera
| President's Award
| 
|-

Juventud Awards
The Juventud Awards are awarded annually by the television network Univision in the United States. Rivera received 5 awards out of 13 nominations, 4 were awarded posthumously. 

|-
| 2007
|rowspan="5" scope="row"|Jenni Rivera (herself)
| Favorite Mexican Artist
| 
|-
| 2008
| Favorite Mexican Artist
| 
|-
| rowspan="2" scope="row"|2009
| My Favorite Concert
| 
|-
| Favorite Regional Mexican Artist
| 
|-
|rowspan="2" scope="row"|2010
| Favorite Regional Mexican Artist
| 
|-
| Jenni Rivera & Esteban Loaiza
|  Hottest Romance
| 
|-
|rowspan="2" scope="row"|2012
| Joyas Prestadas
|  Favorite Album
| 
|-
| Jenni Rivera (herself)
|  Favorite Regional Mexican Artist
| 
|-
|rowspan="4" scope="row"|2013
| "La Misma Gran Senora"
| Favorite Ringtone
| 
|-
| rowspan="3" scope="row"|Jenni Rivera (herself)
| Favorite Pop Artist
| 
|-
| Favorite Regional Mexican Artist
| 
|-
| Most Talked About on Social Media
| 
|-
| 2014
| Filly Brown
|  Favorite Movie with Hispanic Actors and/or Director
| 
|-

Latin Grammy Awards
The Latin Grammy Awards are awarded annually by the Latin Academy of Recording Arts & Sciences in the United States. Rivera has received four nominations.

|-
| 2002
| Se las Voy a Dar a Otro
| Best Banda Album
| 
|-
| 2008
| La Diva en Vivo
|rowspan="2" scope="row"| Best Ranchero Album
| 
|-
| 2010
| La Gran Señora
| 
|-
| 2011
| La Gran Señora en Vivo
| Best Banda Album
| 
|}

Lo Nuestro Awards
The Lo Nuestro Awards are awarded annually by the television network Univision in the United States. Rivera has received eighteen awards from twenty-one nominations. By 2015 (nearly three years after her death), she has received nine accolades posthumously. In 2007, she won Regional Female Artist of the Year, repeating her success in that category eight times, the most in the awards history.

|-
| 2003
|rowspan="2" scope="row"| Jenni Rivera (herself)
| Best Female Artist
| 
|-
|rowspan="3" scope="row"| 2007
| Regional Mexican Female Artist of the Year
| 
|-
| "De Contrabando"
| Regional Mexican Song of the Year
| 
|-
|rowspan="12" scope="row"| Jenni Rivera (herself)
| Banda Artist of the Year
| 
|-
| 2008
|rowspan="2" scope="row"| Regional Mexican Female Artist of the Year
| 
|-
|rowspan="2" scope="row"| 2009
| 
|-
| Banda Artist of the Year
| 
|-
| 2010
|rowspan="2" scope="row"| Regional Mexican Female Artist of the Year
| 
|-
|rowspan="2" scope="row"| 2011
| 
|-
|rowspan="2" scope="row"| Ranchera Artist of the Year
| 
|-
|rowspan="2" scope="row"| 2012
| 
|-
| Regional Mexican Female Artist of the Year
| 
|-
|rowspan="5" scope="row"| 2013
| Artist of the Year
| 
|-
| Pop Female Artist of the Year
| 
|-
| Regional Mexican Female Artist of the Year
| 
|-
| Joyas Prestadas: Pop
| Pop Album of the Year
| 
|-
| "A Cambio de Qué"
| Pop Song of the Year
| 
|-
|rowspan="3" scope="row"| 2014
| "Detrás de Mi Ventana"
| Pop Song of the Year
| 
|-
|rowspan="3" scope="row"| Jenni Rivera (herself)
| Pop Female Artist of the Year
| 
|-
|rowspan="2" scope="row"| Regional Mexican Female Artist of the Year
| 
|-
| 2015
| 
|-

Oye! Awards
Oye! Awards are presented annually by the Academia Nacional de la Música en México for outstanding achievements in the Mexican record industry. The equivalent of Premios Oye! (Spanish, meaning "Hear! Awards") to the United States's Grammy Awards. Rivera received awarded two awards posthumously from nine nominations.

|-
|rowspan="3" scope="row"| 2009
| Jenni (album)
| Popular Album of the Year
| 
|-
| "Culpable ó Inocente"
| Record of the Year
| 
|-
|rowspan="2" scope="row"| Jenni Rivera (herself)
| Banda Artist of the Year
| 
|-
|rowspan="2" scope="row"| 2010
| Ranchera Artist of the Year
| 
|-
| La Gran Señora
| Popular Album of the Year
| 
|-
|rowspan="4" scope="row"|2013
|rowspan="2" scope="row"| Jenni Rivera (herself)
| Banda Artist of the Year
| 
|-
| Pop Female Artist of the Year
| 
|-
| Joyas Prestadas: Banda
| Popular Album of the Year
| 
|-
| "La Misma Gran Señora"
| Popular Song of the Year
| 
|-

Premios de la Radio
Premios de la Radio are presented by the Estrella TV for outstanding musicians in the Regional Mexican genre in the United States.

|-
| 2011
| Jenni Rivera (herself)
| Female Artist of the Year
| 
|-
| 2012
| "Basta Ya"
| Mejor Canción con Banda
| 
|-
| 2012
| Jenni Rivera (herself)
| Female Artist of the Year
| 
|-
| 2012
| Joyas Prestadas: Banda
| Banda Album of the Year
| 
|-
| 2013
| Jenni Rivera (herself)
| Artist of the Year
| 
|-
| 2013
| No Llega el Olvido
| Collaboration of the Year
| 
|-
| 2014
| Jenni Rivera (herself)
| Female Artist of the Year
| 
|-

Premios Tu Mundo
Premios Tu Mundo is produced by Telemundo awarded annually from the American Airlines Arena in Miami, Florida.

|-
| 2013
| I Love Jenni
| Best Reality Moment 
| 
|-
| 2013
| Jenni Rivera - Filly Brown
| Fandango Cine Presents Latino Pride in Hollywood
| 
|-

References

Rivera, Jenni
Awards and nominations